The 2017 Verizon IndyCar Series was the 22nd season of the Verizon IndyCar Series and the 106th official championship season of American open wheel racing. The premier event was the 101st Indianapolis 500 won by Takuma Sato. Josef Newgarden, the 2011 Indy Lights champion, in his sixth full-time season in the IndyCar Series, won the championship. It was Newgarden's first season as part of Team Penske, and he collected four wins, one pole position, and ten top-five finishes. It was Team Penske's 15th Indy car season championship, and third in four years.

Simon Pagenaud entered the season as the defending IndyCar champion, and finished second in points behind his teammate Newgarden. The 2017 season was the final season for the Honda/Chevy aerokits introduced in 2015, as 2018 saw the introduction of a new spec-aerokit.

All events from 2016 returned to the schedule. In addition, the series returned to Gateway Motorsports Park for the first time since 2003.

Series news
On September 2, 2016, it was announced that Performance Friction Brakes has been selected as a brake rotor and pad supplier package for IndyCar Series starting from 2017 season onwards but Brembo remained as brake caliper until the end of 2017 season.

Confirmed entries

This chart represents announced teams, cars and their respective driver combinations for the 2017 season.

Team changes
Chip Ganassi Racing announced their discount retail giants sponsor Target, effective from the 2017 IndyCar season, has discontinued sponsorship after 27 straight years of direct participation. The team also announced on October 7, 2016 that they would be returning to Honda in a multi year deal and thus discontinuing Chevrolet partnership. Ganassi had previously worked with Honda in 1996–99 (CART) and 2006–13 (IndyCar Series), when Jimmy Vasser, Alessandro Zanardi, Juan Pablo Montoya, Scott Dixon and Dario Franchitti won the CART and IndyCar title.
Larry Foyt, president of A. J. Foyt Enterprises, confirmed on October 13 that the team is switching manufacturers from Honda to Chevrolet, with the formal announcement on January 17.
KV Racing Technology will not race in 2017 due to Kevin Kalkhoven and James Sullivan withdrawing funding from the team. The team had been in negotiations with Carlin to sell their remaining equipment, but attempts to secure Indy Lights champion  Ed Jones and Mikhail Aleshin fell through.
On February 21, Juncos Racing confirmed it would field an entry for the 101st Indy 500 with support from Kevin Kalkhoven, following purchase of three cars and equipment from KV Racing Technology. The team entered two cars into the 101st Indy 500, opting to postpone the announcement of their drivers and engine partner until later. On May 9, the team announced that the first of their two entries would be driven by Spencer Pigot. Pigot had previously driven for the team in Indy Lights. On May 10, the team announced that Sebastián Saavedra would drive in the second car.
On April 10, Harding Racing confirmed it would field an entry for the 101st Indy 500, driven by Gabby Chaves. On May 20, the team announced that it would also race at Texas Motor Speedway and Pocono Raceway in preparation for a possible full-season entry for 2018.

Driver changes
 On October 5, Team Penske announced that it had signed Josef Newgarden to drive the No. 2 car for 2017, demoting Juan Pablo Montoya to part-time driver status.
 On October 12, Dale Coyne Racing announced that it had signed Sébastien Bourdais to drive the No. 18 car for two seasons, replacing Conor Daly. Bourdais had driven for Coyne in 2011 after two seasons in Formula One.
 On October 31, Takuma Sato's manager confirmed that the Japanese driver would join Andretti Autosport as the driver of the No. 26 car for 2017, replacing Carlos Muñoz. The deal was officially announced by the team on December 2.
 Also on October 31, Team Penske announced Juan Pablo Montoya would return to the team to compete in the Indianapolis 500. The team later announced that Montoya would also be entered in the IndyCar Grand Prix.
 On November 4, it was confirmed that J. R. Hildebrand will take over the Ed Carpenter Racing No. 21 car for the 2017 season, replacing Josef Newgarden.
 On November 14, it was confirmed that 2016 Indy Lights champion Ed Jones signed with Dale Coyne Racing for the 2017 season to drive the No. 19 car, replacing Luca Filippi, Gabby Chaves, Pippa Mann, and R.C. Enerson.
 On November 15, A. J. Foyt Enterprises announced that Carlos Muñoz and Conor Daly would drive the teams No. 14 and No. 4 cars, respectively for the 2017 season, replacing Takuma Sato and Jack Hawksworth. Conor Daly debuted for Foyt in the 2013 Indianapolis 500.
 On January 16, news broke that Mikhail Aleshin had run into problems with his sponsor, placing his return for 2017 in doubt. Auto GP champion Luis Michael Dörrbecker and former Chip Ganassi Racing driver Sage Karam were in the picture for this seat as a replacement. However, on February 1, it was confirmed that Aleshin's sponsorship issues had been resolved and that he would return to the team for 2017.
 On February 2, Dreyer & Reinbold Racing announced that Sage Karam would return to the team to compete in the Indianapolis 500.
 On March 6, Schmidt Peterson Motorsports announced that Jay Howard would drive the No. 77 Honda in the Indianapolis 500. The entry will be supported by 1997 IndyCar Champion Tony Stewart.
 On March 28, Dale Coyne Racing announced that Pippa Mann would drive the No. 63 Honda in the Indianapolis 500. It will be the fifth consecutive year that Mann has driven for the team.
 On April 7, A. J. Foyt Enterprises announced that Firestone Indy Lights driver Zach Veach would drive the No. 40 Chevrolet at the Indianapolis 500.
 On April 9, Michael Shank Racing announced that Jack Harvey would drive the No. 50 Honda at the Indianapolis 500. The team will run with support from Andretti Autosport. 
 On April 12, McLaren Honda announced a partnership with Andretti Autosport to enter a single car in the Indianapolis 500, to be driven by two-time F1 World Champion Fernando Alonso. The Spaniard skipped the Monaco Grand Prix in order to participate in the 500.
 On April 18, Ed Carpenter Racing announced that Zach Veach would fill in for J. R. Hildebrand for the race at Barber Motorsports Park. Hildebrand had suffered a broken bone in his left hand following an incident at the Grand Prix of Long Beach. Hildebrand was cleared to return for the following race at Phoenix International Raceway.
 On April 22, Buddy Lazier announced that he would be competing in the Indianapolis 500 for Lazier Partners Racing. It will be Lazier's 20th start in the race.
 On May 20, Sébastien Bourdais suffered multiple pelvic fractures and a fractured hip after a severe incident during qualifying for the Indy 500, forcing him to sit out the remainder of the season. The following day, Dale Coyne Racing announced that Indy 500 veteran James Davison would fill in for the 500.
 On June 1, Dale Coyne Racing announced that former Formula One driver Esteban Gutiérrez would pilot the No. 18 car at the Detroit Grand Prix. Following the race at Texas, Gutierrez was confirmed in the No. 18 car until Sébastien Bourdais' return at Gateway.
 On June 6, Dale Coyne Racing announced that Tristan Vautier would drive the No. 18 car at Texas Motor Speedway. Vautier was chosen after Gutiérrez was not able to complete an oval rookie test due to an IndyCar testing blackout period.
 On June 22, Schmidt Peterson Motorsports announced that Robert Wickens would drive the No. 7 car in place of Mikhail Aleshin for the Kohler Grand Prix due to issues with Aleshin's visa. Wickens partook in the first practice session, but Aleshin's visa issues were solved by Saturday, so Aleshin returned to the car for the rest of the weekend.
 On July 13, Schmidt Peterson Motorsports announced that Sebastián Saavedra would drive the No. 7 car in place of Mikhail Aleshin for the Honda Indy Toronto.
 On August 12, Schmidt Peterson Motorsports announced that Mikhail Aleshin would no longer race for the team. On August 16, the team announced that Sebastián Saavedra would return to the No. 7 car for the races at Pocono Raceway and Gateway Motorsports Park. On August 20, the team announced that Jack Harvey would drive the car for the final two races of the season at Watkins Glen and Sonoma.
 On August 23, Dale Coyne Racing announced that Sébastien Bourdais had recovered from his injuries sustained earlier in the season and would return to drive the final three races of the season.
 On September 6, Rahal Letterman Lanigan Racing announced that it would enter a second car for Zachary Claman DeMelo for the final race of the season at Sonoma.

Schedule
All races were held in the United States, except the Toronto round.

 Oval/Speedway
 Road course
 Street circuit

All 16 races from 2016 returned. Gateway Motorsports Park returns to the schedule for the first time since 2003. The only other schedule change is the move of the race at Phoenix from the first weekend in April to the last weekend in April to avoid a conflict with the Final Four being held in nearby Glendale, Arizona. The Long Beach race was the second race of the season as opposed to being the third race of the season in 2016.

The Grand Prix of Indianapolis was rebranded as the IndyCar Grand Prix for the 2017 running of the event following an announcement that Angie's List would no longer sponsor the event.

Results

Points standings

 Ties are broken by number of wins, followed by number of 2nds, 3rds, etc., then by number of pole positions, followed by number of times qualified 2nd, etc.

Driver standings 

 One championship point is awarded to each driver who leads at least one race lap. Two additional championship points are awarded to the driver who leads most laps during a race.
 At all races except the Indy 500, the number 1 qualifier earns one point. At double header races, the fastest qualifier of each qualifying group earns one championship point.
 Entrant-initiated engine change-outs before the engines reach their required distance run will result in the loss of ten points.
 NOTE:  The distance run will be based on the total distance raced by that entrant with the engine in question, regardless of driver.

Entrant standings 

 Based on the entrant, used for oval qualifications order, and starting grids when qualifying is cancelled.
 Only full-time entrants, and at-large part-time entrants shown.

Manufacturer standings

 All manufacturer points (including qualifying points, race finish points, and race win bonus points) can only be earned by full-season entrants.
 The top two finishing entrants from each manufacturer in each race score championship points for their respective manufacturer. The manufacturer that wins each race will be awarded five additional points.
 At all races except the Indy 500, the manufacturer who qualifies on pole earns one point. At the Indy 500, the fastest Saturday qualifier earns one point, while the pole position winner on Sunday earns two points.
 For every full-season engine used during the Indy 500 that reaches 2,000 total miles run, the manufacturer earns bonus points equal to that engine's finishing position in the race.
 Ties are broken by number of wins, followed by number of 2nds, 3rds, etc.

Footnotes

References

External links
 

 
2017
IndyCar Series
2017 in motorsport